Oľga Beständigová (born 2 May 1979) is a Slovak former competitive pair skater. With her brother, Jozef Beständig, she won nine senior international medals and eight Slovak national titles. They competed at the 2002 Winter Olympics, five World Championships, and seven European Championships, placing as high as 7th (2001 Europeans).

Beständigová competed with her boyfriend İlhan Mansız for Turkey from 2013 to 2015.

Career

Partnership with Beständig 
Beständigová competed for Slovakia with her brother, Jozef Beständig. Their first ISU Championship was the 1997 Europeans in Paris; they finished last (17th). The following season, they placed 12th at the 1998 Europeans in Milan and 18th at the 1998 Worlds in Minneapolis.

Beständigová/Beständig achieved their highest ISU Championship result, 7th, at the 2001 Europeans in Bratislava. They would go on to qualify for the 2002 Winter Olympics in Salt Lake City, Utah, where they finished 17th.

Beständigová retired from competition following the 2001–02 season but returned to compete with her brother again for the 2004–05 season. The pair placed 8th at the 2005 European Championships in Turin and 15th at the 2005 World Championships in Moscow. They then ended their partnership.

Later career 
Beständigová competed briefly with Vladimir Futáš in 2005 and then decided to perform in ice shows. She participated in the Turkish show Buzda Dans in the winters of 2006–07 and 2007–08. She won the second edition of the show with her partner, İlhan Mansız. In 2010, Beständigová and Mansız began training in an attempt to qualify for the pairs' event at the 2014 Winter Olympics. They initially trained in Oberstdorf and Garmisch with coaches Alexander König and Stefan Zins, and later with Doug Ladret, Don Baldwin, and Tiffany Vise in Scottsdale, Arizona. Beständigová/Mansız made their competitive debut together at the 2013 Nebelhorn Trophy, which was also the final qualifying opportunity for the Olympics. It was Beständigová's first international competition in eight years. The pair finished 19th and last in the pairs event, ending their hope of skating at the Olympic Games. Their partnership ended in 2015.

Programs

With Mansız

With Beständig

Results
GP: Champions Series/Grand Prix; CS: Challenger Series

With Mansız for Turkey

With Futáš for Slovakia

With Beständig for Slovakia

References

External links

 
  
  

Slovak female pair skaters
Olympic figure skaters of Slovakia
Figure skaters at the 2002 Winter Olympics
1979 births
Living people
Figure skaters from Bratislava
Slovak expatriate sportspeople in Turkey